BIO.be, the Belgian Association for Bioindustries is a Belgian non-profit organization of companies and professionals involved in biotechnology, and those servicing the biotechnology community. The organization works on innovation and entrepreneurship in the biotech industry. The headquarters of the organization are located in Brussels. The chairman is Philippe Stas (AlgoNomics) and the Secretary General is Hugo Francq.

See also
 Pharma.be
 Science and technology in Flanders
 Science and technology in Wallonia
 Belgian Society of Biochemistry and Molecular Biology
 EuropaBio
 FlandersBio
 European Federation of Pharmaceutical Industries and Associations (EFPIA)

Sources
 Contributions of modern biotechnology to European policy objectives
 De Biotech industrie verwelkomt de aankondiging van de Europese Commissie over het Europese "Lead Market Initiative" (Dutch)

External links
 Belgian Association for Bioindustries
 Belgian Association for Bioindustries

Medical and health organisations based in Belgium
Science and technology in Belgium